Barnala district

The village of Sehna is located in Barnala district of Punjab, India.

Sehna is a village in Tapa Tehsil, It is located 17 km towards west from District headquarters Barnala. 160 km from State capital Chandigarh and 8 km from Bhadaur City.

Shaina Pin code is 148103 and postal Head office is Shaina .

Sehna is surrounded by Phul Tehsil towards west, Barnala Tehsil towards East, Mehal Kalan Tehsil towards North, Nihal Singh Wala Tehsil towards North .

Barnala, Bhadaur, Rampura Phul, Raikot , Longowal are the nearby Cities to Sehna.

This Place is in the border of the Barnala District and Bathinda District. Bathinda District Phul is west towards this place .

Demographics of Shaina 
Punjabi is the local language here.

Transport

By Rail 
Ghunas Rail Way Station is the nearest railway stations to Sehna.

Colleges in Shaina

Punjab Multipurpose Institute College, Shaina, Punjab

Main Road, Near Milk Plant

Shaina, District Barnala

Punjab, India - 148103

Nearby Colleges

Aryabhatta Group Of Institutes

Address : Village Cheema-jodhpur , Barnala Punjab

Schools near Shaina 
G. Gobind Singh Academy

Address : sehna , sehna , barnala , Punjab . PIN- 148103 , Post - Shaina

Gurudev Pub. Sch.

Address : balloke , sehna , barnala , Punjab . PIN- 148108 , Post - Tapa

Brilliant Mod Sch

Address : mallian , sehna , barnala , Punjab . PIN- 148103 , Post - Shaina

References 
Pincode of Shaina, Barnala, Punjab is 148103. Pincode of Shaina, Barnala, Punjab. (n.d.). Retrieved December 30, 2021, from https://pincodes.info/in/Punjab/Barnala/Shaina/

Punjabcolleges.com. 2021. Punjab Multipurpose Institute College, Sehna (Shaina), Punjab » PunjabColleges.com. [online] Available at: <https://www.punjabcolleges.com/30863-indiacolleges-Punjab-Multipurpose-Institute-College-Sehna-(Shaina)/> [Accessed 30 December 2021].

Cities and towns in Barnala district